Number of public schools (2017)

 Nursery: 471
 Primary: 436
 Secondary: 242
 Special education: 6

Notable secondary schools in Guyana:

Anna Regina Secondary School
Berbice High School
Bishops' High School, Guyana
Central High School, Guyana
Georgetown International Academy
Hindu College (Cove and John, Guyana)
Mackenzie High School
Marian Academy
North West Secondary School
Port Kaituma Community School
President's College
Queen's College, Guyana 
Santa Rosa Secondary School
School of the Nations
St. Rose's High School, Guyana
St. Stanislaus College

See also 

 List of universities and colleges in Guyana
 Education in Guyana

References 

Guyana
Guyana
 
Schools
Schools
Schools